Škoda 7Ev is an electric multiple unit produced by Škoda Transportation. The trainset was developed at the order of the České dráhy in 2011.

Multiple variants of unit were developed, ranging from 2-car unit to 5-car unit. In the middle of 2022, a total of 270 Škoda 7Ev or derived cars are in operation and in production.

Operators

České dráhy

RegioPanter 
The České dráhy ordered 3 different variants of trainsets in 2011. The first order consisted of 12 units of class 440 (3-car, 241 seats), 3 units of class 640 (3-car, 241 seats) and 4 units of class 650 (2-car, 147 seats). First five units entered service in September 2012. Then came several more orders. Škoda Transportation currently producing another 50 units of improved class 650 marked 650.2 and also 60 units of class 640.2. In the Czech Republic, the train sets of the Czech Railways carrier are known as RegioPanter.

All 440 class units will be in 2021-2022 upgraded to multi-system class 640.1 due to gradual switching to AC traction system. This upgrade will be made by Škoda Transportation.

In 2020, one 650 class unit was tested on the Tábor-Bechyně railway. The reason was to verify compatibility with small arc radii due to possible future deployment on this railway.

InterPanter 
In 2015-16 were built 14 units Škoda 10Ev for fast train lines, which are use on routes Brno-Prague and Brno-Břeclav-Olomouc. The České dráhy use the brand name InterPanter for these units. InterPanter units have fewer doors, more luggage and bicycle space and a vending machine with snacks.

Železničná spoločnosť Slovensko 
In 2018 Škoda Transportation in consortium with ŽOS Trnava won contract with Železničná spoločnosť Slovensko to supply 8 3-car units and 2 4-car dual-voltage units. The contract included the option for additional 5 3-car units and 10 4-car units. First unit entered service on 1 December 2020 on the Žilina–Čadca–Zwardoń line.

Železničná spoločnosť Slovensko ordered in August 2021 from Škoda Transportation another nine trains for Košice region. There is also a purchase option for 11 additional trains. EMUs will enter service in 2023.

Pasažieru vilciens 
Škoda Transportation won tender of the Pasažieru vilciens to supply 32 electric multiple units for suburban lines by Riga. Units with 436 seats (4 cars), the 1,520 mm gauge, wide carbody, dual system equipment (3 kV DC and 25 kV AC) and top speed up to 160 km/h will be delivered in 2022–23.

South Moravian Region 
In 2019 South Moravian Region in Czech Republic selected Škoda Transportation as the supplier of 37 electrical units for suburban transport of Brno. There will be 31 4-car units with 333 seats and 6 2-cars units with 146 seats. The units will be owned by the region and leased to carriers. The trainsets will be named Moravia after the very first locomotive, which arrived in Brno in 1838. The design of the units was introduced in September 2020.

Elron 
In October 2020, the Estonian state-owned railway operator Elron announced to order six  electric units with option to order 10 more, which totals to 16 units. Units would go to operation in the second half of 2024 and run mainly the Tallinn-Tartu line. They would operate the country's passenger train system next to 38 Stadler FLIRT units.

Cancelled contracts

National Express 
In 2015 National Express Germany won a 12-year contract to operate Nuremberg S-Bahn services from December 2018. Its bid included 38 5-car 7Ev trainsets owned by a leasing company. The total value of the contract would have exceeded €380 million. However, in 2016 National Express pulled out of the bid and order was cancelled.

Fleet details

See also 
 Škoda Works
 List of Škoda Transportation products

References

External links 
 
 
 RegioPanter on Škoda Transportation site 
 Official website of RegioPanter 

Electric multiple units of the Czech Republic
Škoda locomotives
Articles containing video clips
3000 V DC multiple units
25 kV AC multiple units